Emperor Ming may refer to:

 Emperors of the Ming Dynasty
 Emperor Ming of Han (28-75) 
 Emperor Ming of Wei (205-239), see Cao Rui
 Emperor Ming of Zhao (274 - 333), see Shi Le
 Emperor Ming of Jin (299 - 325)
 Emperor Ming of Liu Song (439 - 472)
 Emperor Ming of Southern Qi (452 - 498)
 Emperor Ming of Northern Zhou (534 - 560)
 Emperor Ming of Western Liang (542–585)
 Emperor Xuanzong of Tang (685 - 762), sometimes referred to as Emperor Ming
 Ming the Merciless, a fictional character in the Flash Gordon stories